Mukulia is a village in North Kivu in eastern Democratic Republic of the Congo. It is located several kilometres to the south of Beni, connected by the N2 highway.

External links
Maplandia World Gazetteer

Populated places in North Kivu